AOTC may refer to:
 American Opportunity Tax Credit, a partially refundable tax credit detailed in Section 1004 of the American Recovery and Reinvestment Act of 2009.
 Star Wars: Episode II – Attack of the Clones, a Star Wars film
 N-acetylornithine carbamoyltransferase, an enzyme
Ahead of the Curve, a World of Warcraft achievement for completing raid tier on heroic before releasing a new raid tier